

Current chains

 108 Shop
 7-Eleven
 Big C group, includes:
Mini Big C
Big C Supercenter
Big C Extra
Big C Foodplace
 Central Food Retail (a part of Central Retail Corporation) group, includes:
Central Food Hall
Tops Daily 
Tops Market 
Tops Superkoom
Tops SUPERSTORE
 CP Fresh Mart
 CJ Express
 FamilyMart (a part of Central Retail Corporation) group
 Fresh Mart
 Foodland
 Gourmet Market & Home Fresh Mart (part of The Mall Group)
 Isetan
 Jiffy
 Lawson 108 (a part of Lawson and 108 Shop)
 Makro (Metro AG)
 Maxvalu Tokai
 Rimping 
 Spar
 Super Cheap
 Lotus's group, includes:
Lotus's go fresh
Lotus's
Lotus's Talad
 UFM Fuji Super (a part of Fuji Citio and Srikrung Wattana Group)
 Villa Market

Defunct chains
 Auchan (branches in Thailand now changed and acquired by Big C)
 Carrefour (has been taken over by Group Casino and all Carrefour branches have been renamed Big C or Big C Extra)
 Food Lion (Branches in Thailand now acquired by Central Food Retail)
 The Mall Group
 Seiyu Group, includes:
SEIYU (branches in Thailand now acquired by Jusco Thailand)
 Shop N Save (branches in Singapore now changed and acquired by Shabell)
Super Save
 Tops Supermarket 
Spar

References

Thailand

Supermarket chains